Cougar Marching Band may refer to multiple university marching bands including:

BYU Cougar Marching Band, also known as the "Power of the Wasatch"
Spirit of Houston, the University of Houston Marching Band
Washington State University Cougar Marching Band

Marching bands